Ardscoil Mhuire is an Irish voluntary Catholic single-sex girls' secondary school situated in Mackney, near Ballinasloe in County Galway. It is under the trusteeship of Catholic Education an Irish Schools Trust (CEIST).

History
Ardscoil Mhuire was founded by the Sisters of Mercy in Ballinasloe in 1919. In January 2003, the school moved to the current location in Mackney, near Ballinasloe, County Galway.

On 9 March 2019, a Heritage Day was held to coincide with the school's 100th anniversary, with celebrations begun on 5 February 2019.

As of 2020, the principal of Ardscoil Mhuire was Pauric Hanlon.

Curriculum
The school offers both the Junior and Leaving Certificate cycles and a Transition Year cycle. Ardscoil Mhuire offers all the mandatory subjects, along with music & arts, speech & drama, home economics, debating, public speaking and an ICT programme.

References

External links
Ardscoil Mhuire – Official website

Ballinasloe
Girls' schools in the Republic of Ireland
Secondary schools in County Galway
Educational institutions established in 1919
1919 establishments in Ireland